The Northwest Ohio League (also the Northwestern Ohio Intercollegiate Athletic Association and Little Ohio Conference) was an intercollegiate athletic conference that existed from 1921 to 1932. The conference's members were located in the state of Ohio.

Members

Football champions

1921 – Bowling Green
1922 – Bowling Green
1923 – Toledo
1924 – 

1925 – Bowling Green
1926 – 
1927 – Toledo
1928 – Bowling Green

1929 – Bowling Green and Toledo
1930 – 
1931 – 
1932 –

See also
List of defunct college football conferences

References